Amos B. Smith III (born August 26, 1944) is an American chemist.

Biography
He is most notable for his research in the total synthesis of complex natural product, as well as the chemistry of mammalian pheromones and chemical communication.

He currently works at the Monell Chemical Senses Center and holds the Rhodes-Thompson Professorship of Chemistry at the University of Pennsylvania's Department of Chemistry.

Amos B. Smith III  is a fellow of the American Academy of Arts and Sciences and member of the ESPCI ParisTech Scientific Council.

In 2015, he was awarded the Royal Society of Chemistry's Perkin Prize for Organic Chemistry "for his continued outstanding contributions to new organic reaction development, complex natural product total synthesis, and new small molecules for medicinal chemistry".

References

External links 

 

21st-century American chemists
1944 births
Living people
Organic chemists